Tsogo (Getsogo) is a Bantu language of Gabon. It is one of the principal languages of the Babongo Pygmies.

References

Languages of Gabon
Tsogo languages